Ralph Pfersich (born 18 April 1966) is a German former sprinter. He competed in the men's 4 × 400 metres relay at the 1992 Summer Olympics.

References

External links
 

1966 births
Living people
Athletes (track and field) at the 1992 Summer Olympics
German male sprinters
Olympic athletes of Germany
People from Treuchtlingen
Sportspeople from Middle Franconia